is a Tekken video game released for the WonderSwan. It uses the characters from Tekken 3, including an exclusive playable character to the game, Crow, which previously appeared as NPCs in the original.

Gameplay 

Tekken Card Challenge utilizes a system similar to its Pokémon counterpart. Two opponents are to fight at a time, with various cards for different maneuvers and a 100-point HP total for damage accumulation. The player begins with a hand of four cards, drawing more as the duel proceeds. The battle system is similar to Yu-Gi-Oh! in that the three types of cards perform in a rock, paper, and scissors pattern. Attack cards are played against each other to compare values with the loser being discarded and deducting HP, an attack card played against a defense nullifies each other (except in the case of a counter), and two block cards cancel each other out. There is also a minor system of air juggling, which can be quite damaging given the correct order of cards.

Tekken Card Challenge also provides the player with a variety of game modes. There is a link mode present, 1-player battle, and (the main mode) Adventure, which allows the player to unlock more characters and duel opponents. In adventure mode, the player is given movement of a character sprite in a full environment taken place on a 15 x 15 square grid to traverse. The point of each stage is to defeat each "duelist" given limited number of steps and gain entrance to the exit.

Character list

External links
Tekken Card Challenge for WonderSwan at GameSpot.com
Tekken Card Challenge Boxart at GameSpot.com

1999 video games
WonderSwan games
Digital collectible card games
Japan-exclusive video games
Video games developed in Japan
Card Challenge